Pachybrachis texanus is a species of case-bearing leaf beetle in the family Chrysomelidae. It is found in Central America and North America.

References

Further reading

 

texanus
Articles created by Qbugbot
Beetles described in 1909
Beetles of Central America
Beetles of North America